Pseudaraeococcus chlorocarpus is a species of flowering plant in the family Bromeliaceae, native to Brazil (the state of Bahia). It was first described in 1862 as Lamprococcus chlorocarpus.

References

Bromelioideae
Endemic flora of Brazil
Flora of Bahia
Plants described in 1862